Stoeber is a surname. Notable people with the surname include: 

Adolphe Stoeber (1810–1892), French ecclesiastic and writer
Jack Stoeber (1898–1971), American college football player and coach
Orville Stoeber (born 1947), American singer/songwriter, actor, and artist

See also
Stober